Turmathrips is a genus of thrips in the family Phlaeothripidae.

Species
 Turmathrips apistus
 Turmathrips dyspistus

References

Phlaeothripidae
Thrips
Thrips genera